The 2017 Michigan Wolverines football team represented the University of Michigan in the sport of college football during the 2017 NCAA Division I FBS football season. The Wolverines played in the East Division of the Big Ten Conference and played their home games at Michigan Stadium in Ann Arbor, Michigan. Michigan was coached by Jim Harbaugh, who was in his third season.

Coming off back-to-back 10-win seasons in Harbaugh's first two years as coach, the Wolverines began the year ranked 11th in the preseason AP Poll. In the first game of the season, Michigan defeated then-No. 17 Florida in the Advocare Classic in Arlington, Texas. Michigan won its remaining non-conference games as well as its conference opener against Purdue, rising to No. 7 in the polls before suffering its first loss in a home game against in-state rival Michigan State. Michigan lost three more games in conference play, all to teams ranked in the top ten at the time of play: first to then-No. 2 Penn State, then to No. 5 Wisconsin, and finally to arch-rival No. 8 Ohio State to end the regular season. Michigan ended Big Ten Conference play with a 5–4 record to finish in fourth in the Eastern Division. The Wolverines were invited to the 2018 Outback Bowl, played on New Year's Day, where they lost to South Carolina to finish the year at 8–5.

Michigan struggled to find consistent play at quarterback throughout the year; with Wilton Speight suffering a season ending injury in the team's week 4 contest at Purdue, John O'Korn, and Brandon Peters each received significant playing time in his stead. The team recorded only nine passing touchdowns on the year. Karan Higdon led the team on the ground with 994 rushing yards, and Grant Perry led the team in receiving with 307 yards. The defense, despite losing 10 starters from 2016, was considered one of the best in the country. Lineman Maurice Hurst Jr. was named a consensus first-team All-American. Linebacker Devin Bush Jr. and linemen Rashan Gary and Chase Winovich also received first-team all-conference honors.

Preseason

Spring game 
Michigan played a public spring exhibition game in Michigan Stadium on Saturday, April 15, 2017. The announced attendance was 57,418. The Maize team's Kyle Seychel kicked a 31-yard field goal as time expired for the 31–29 win.

Italy trip 
The Michigan football team traveled to Italy for a week in late April for training, sight-seeing, and brand exposure. The team held three public practices and hosted other publicity events. Coach Jim Harbaugh was offered the opportunity to meet Pope Francis, during which he gifted the Pope an authentic Michigan helmet and a pair of Michigan-themed Jordan Brand shoes.

Recruiting

Position key

Recruits 

Michigan's recruiting class consisted of 30 recruits, including 11 that enrolled early. Michigan's recruiting class was ranked No. 3 by Scout, No. 4 by Rivals, No. 6 by ESPN, and No. 5 by 247Sports.com's composite rankings. The class was considered one of Michigan's strongest recruiting classes from the modern era, and was highlighted by composite 5-star prospects WR Donovan Peoples-Jones and DL Aubrey Solomon.

Rankings

Schedule

Radio 
Radio coverage for all games is broadcast statewide on The Michigan IMG Sports Network and on Sirius XM Satellite Radio. The radio announcers were Jim Brandstatter (in his final season with the team) with play-by-play, Dan Dierdorf with color commentary, and Doug Karsch with sideline reports.

Game summaries

vs. Florida 

 Sources:

    
    
    
    
    
    
    
    
    

To open the season, Michigan faced the Florida Gators in a neutral site game in Arlington, Texas in the Advocare Classic. This was the first meeting between the teams since the 2016 Citrus Bowl. It was the fourth meeting between Michigan and Florida, and the first ever regular season meeting between the teams.

Michigan defeated Florida, 33–17. Florida opened the scoring in the first quarter via a 46-yard field goal from Eddy Piñeiro. Michigan responded with a 25-yard field goal from Quinn Nordin to tie the game, and a 46-yard touchdown pass from Wilton Speight to Tarik Black, for its first lead of the game. Florida added 14 points in the second quarter via back-to-back interception returns, a 48-yard interception return from Duke Dawson, and a 41-yard interception return from C. J. Henderson. Wilton Speight was briefly benched in the second quarter, replaced by John O'Korn. He re-entered the game to start the second half. Michigan reduced Florida's lead to four points via a 55-yard field goal from Nordin, which made the score 17–13 in favor of Florida at half-time. Michigan then scored 20 unanswered points in the second half, via a three-yard touchdown run from Karan Higdon and 30-yard field goal from Nordin in the third quarter. Michigan extended its lead in the fourth quarter via a 50-yard field goal from Nordin and a fumble recovery in the end-zone by Noah Furbush.

Michigan wore all-maize alternate jerseys for the first time since 1928. With the win, Michigan ended Florida's 27-year season-opener winning streak, which was the longest active streak in the nation. Kicker Quinn Nordin became the first kicker in Michigan history with two successful conversions of field goals of 50 yards or longer in the same game. Just one game into his career, Nordin is tied for third in program history for most attempts made at 50 yards or more.

vs. Cincinnati 

 Sources:

    
    
    
    
    
    
    
    

Following its opening game against Florida, Michigan hosted the Cincinnati Bearcats. This was the first ever meeting between the two teams.

Michigan defeated Cincinnati 36–14. Michigan opened the scoring in the first quarter via a 43-yard touchdown pass from Speight to Kekoa Crawford. Michigan extended its lead via a 28-yard interception return from Tyree Kinnel. Cincinnati reduced Michigan's lead to seven points via a one-yard touchdown run from Mike Boone. Michigan added a 28-yard field goal from Nordin in the second quarter, which made the score 17–7 in favor of Michigan at half-time. Cincinnati opened the scoring in the third quarter via a 10-yard touchdown pass from Hayden Moore to Kahlil Lewis. Michigan responded with a 33-yard touchdown pass from Speight to Grant Perry later in the third quarter, and extended its lead in the fourth quarter via a 24-yard field goal from Nordin, a safety when Cincinnati fumbled a punt, and a 24-yard interception return from Lavert Hill.

Michigan's honorary captain for the game was ESPN NFL Insider and 1989 alumni Adam Schefter. Wilton Speight surpassed the 3,000-yard passing mark for his career, becoming the 13th quarterback in Michigan history to reach the milestone.

vs. Air Force 

 Sources:

    
    
    
    
    
    
    
    
    

After playing Cincinnati, Michigan hosted the Air Force Falcons. This was the first meeting between the schools since 2012.

Michigan defeated Air Force 29–13. The teams exchanged field goals in the first and second quarter, before a 49-yard field goal from Nordin at the end of the second quarter, which made the score 9–6 in favor of Michigan at half-time. Michigan opened the scoring in the third quarter via a 79-yard punt return from Donovan Peoples-Jones. Air Force responded with a 64-yard touchdown pass from Arion Worthman to Ronald Cleveland. Michigan extended its lead via a 29-yard field goal from Nordin later in the third quarter. Michigan added 10 points in the fourth quarter via a 36-yard field from Nordin and a 36-yard touchdown run from Karan Higdon.

Michigan's honorary captain for the game was Michigan's director of player personnel Sean Magee. Kicker Quinn Nordin went 5-for-5 on field goal attempts to tie Michigan's single game record. Donovan Peoples-Jones' 79-yard punt return for a touchdown was the longest since Derrick Alexander returned one 79-yards against North Carolina State in 1993.

at Purdue 

 Sources:

    
    
    
    
    

Following its game against Air Force, Michigan began its conference schedule when it traveled to West Lafayette, Indiana to face the Purdue Boilermakers.

Michigan defeated Purdue 28–10. After neither team scored in the first quarter, Michigan opened the scoring in the second quarter via a 12-yard touchdown pass from John O'Korn to Zach Gentry. Purdue responded with a 10-yard touchdown pass from Elijah Sindelar to Brycen Hopkins. Purdue then took its first lead of the game via a 29-yard field goal from J. D. Dellinger, which made the score 10–7 in favor of Purdue at half-time. Michigan then scored 21 unanswered points in the second half, via a 10-yard touchdown run from Chris Evans, a one-yard touchdown run from Ty Isaac, and a 49-yard touchdown run from Evans.

Michigan's defense held Purdue to 0-for-12 on third-down conversions, as Purdue did not convert a first down in the second half. Purdue was held to only 10 total yards in the second half.

vs. Michigan State 

 Sources:

    
    
    

After a bye week, the Wolverines hosted their in-state rival, the Michigan State Spartans, in the battle for the Paul Bunyan Trophy.

Michigan State upset Michigan 14–10. Michigan opened the scoring in the first quarter via a 30-yard field goal from Quinn Nordin. Michigan State responded with a 14-yard touchdown run from Brian Lewerke. Michigan State extended its lead in the second quarter via a 16-yard touchdown pass from Lewerke to Madre London, which made the score 14–3 in favor of Michigan State at half-time. Michigan reduced the Spartans lead to four points in the third quarter via a one-yard touchdown run from Khalid Hill. Michigan's attempted comeback failed when O'Korn's Hail Mary pass was incomplete to end the game.

Michigan's honorary captains for the game were Sue Burton, the widow of former assistant coach Tirrel Burton; Jerry Hanlon, former assistant coach under Bo Schembechler; Gordon Bell, former Michigan tailback; and Ed Muransky, former All-American tackle for Michigan. The loss snapped Michigan's 10-game home winning streak at Michigan Stadium. Michigan's five turnovers were the most since recording six in 2012. Michigan's 10 points were the program's fewest since 2014. Michigan's defense held Michigan State to 2-for-14 on third-down conversions, and only 66 total yards in the second half. The game marked the first prime time game in the history of the rivalry.

at Indiana 

 Sources:

    
    
    
    
    
    
    
    

Michigan returned to the road to face the Indiana Hoosiers in Bloomington, Indiana in its sixth game of the season.

Michigan defeated Indiana 27–20 in overtime. Michigan opened the scoring in the first quarter via a 40-yard field goal from Quinn Nordin. Michigan added ten points in the second quarter via a 38-yard field goal from Nordin and a 12-yard touchdown run from Karan Higdon. Indiana reduced Michigan's lead to ten points via a 32-yard field goal from Griffin Oakes, which made the score 13–3 in favor of Michigan at half-time. Indiana opened the scoring in the second half via an eight-yard touchdown run from Morgan Ellison. Michigan extended its lead in the fourth quarter via a 59-yard touchdown run from Higdon. Indiana responded with ten points in the fourth quarter via an eight-yard touchdown pass from Peyton Ramsey to Whop Philyor, and a field goal from Oakes as time expired to tie the game and force overtime. In overtime, Michigan scored via a 25-yard touchdown run from Higdon to win the game.

The win marked Michigan's 500th in Big Ten conference play, becoming the first Big Ten team to reach the milestone.

at Penn State 

 Sources:

    
    
    
    
    
    
    

Following its clash with Indiana, Michigan traveled to University Park, Pennsylvania to face the Penn State Nittany Lions. A group of Penn State students caused controversy when it displayed a sign saying Michigan's quarterbacks are worse than the Flint water crisis. Penn State's administration has since denounced the students' actions.

Michigan lost to Penn State 42–13. Penn State scored 14 points in the first quarter via two touchdown runs from Saquon Barkley, from 69 yards and 15 yards, respectively. Michigan responded with 13 points in the second quarter via a one-yard touchdown run from Karan Higdon, and a six-yard touchdown run from Ty Isaac, to reduce the Nittany Lions' lead to one point. Penn State extended its lead in the second quarter via a three-yard touchdown run from Trace McSorley, which made the score 21–13 in favor of Penn State at half-time. Penn State then scored 21 unanswered points in the second half via a 13-yard touchdown run from McSorley in the third quarter, and a 42-yard touchdown pass from McSorley to Barkley and a nine-yard touchdown run from McSorley in the fourth quarter.

vs. Rutgers 

 Sources:

    
    
    
    
    
    

After its game against Penn State, Michigan faced the Rutgers Scarlet Knights in Michigan's homecoming game. Michigan had demolished Rutgers in the previous meeting 78–0.

Michigan defeated the Scarlet Knights 35–14. After neither team scored in the first quarter, Michigan opened the scoring in the second quarter via a one-yard touchdown run from Khalid Hill. Rutgers responded with a 65-yard touchdown run from Janarion Grant to tie the game. Michigan responded with a 10-yard touchdown run from Karan Higdon, and a 20-yard touchdown pass from Brandon Peters to Chris Evans, which made the score 21–7 in favor of Michigan at half-time. The teams exchanged touchdowns in the third quarter via a five-yard touchdown run from Kareem Walker for Michigan, and a two-yard touchdown run from Gus Edwards for Rutgers. Michigan extended its lead in the fourth quarter via a 49-yard touchdown run from Higdon.

Michigan's 334 rushing yards were its most since recording 481 rushing yards at Rutgers last season, while its 471 total yards was a season-high, and the most since recording 660 total yards the previous season against Maryland. Karan Higdon and Ty Isaac both surpassed 100-yards rushing, marking the 40th time in program history that Michigan had a pair of 100-yard rushers. The last time Michigan accomplished the feat was last year against Rutgers. Michigan tied a season-high with 11 tackles-for-loss.

vs. Minnesota 

 Sources:

    
    
    
    
    
    

After facing Rutgers, Michigan will host the Minnesota Golden Gophers for the Little Brown Jug. In the previous meeting (in 2015), Michigan defeated Minnesota, 29–26.

Michigan defeated Minnesota 33–10. Michigan opened the scoring in the first quarter via a 20-yard touchdown pass from Brandon Peters to Sean McKeon. Minnesota responded with a 10-yard touchdown run from Rodney Smith to tie the game. Michigan regained the lead via a 77-yard touchdown run from Karan Higdon. Michigan extended its lead in the second quarter via a 60-yard touchdown run from Chris Evans, which made the score 20–7 in favor of Michigan at half-time. Michigan added 13 points in the third quarter via a five-yard touchdown run from Higdon, and a 67-touchdown run from Evans. Minnesota responded with a 23-yard field goal from Emmit Carpenter in the fourth quarter.

With Karan Higdon rushing for 200 yards, and Chris Evans rushing for 191 yards, Michigan had a pair of 100-yard rushers in consecutive games for the first time since 1975. Karan Higdon recorded his second 200-yard game of the season, becoming the first Michigan running back to record multiple 200-yard games in the same season since Mike Hart in 2004. Khaleke Hudson's eight tackles-for-loss broke the single game franchise record, surpassing the previous record of seven set by Larry Foote at Iowa in 2001.

at Maryland 

 Sources:

    
    
    
    
    
    

After hosting Minnesota, Michigan traveled to College Park, Maryland to face the Maryland Terrapins.

Michigan defeated Maryland 35–10. Michigan opened the scoring in the first quarter via a two-yard touchdown run from Henry Poggi. Michigan added 21 points in the second quarter via a one-yard touchdown run from Chris Evans, a 33-yard touchdown pass from Brandon Peters to Zach Gentry, and a three-yard touchdown pass from Peters to Sean McKeon, which made the score 28–0 in favor of Michigan at half-time. Maryland opened the scoring in the second half via a 20-yard field goal from Henry Darmstadter. The teams exchanged touchdowns in the fourth quarter via a 10-yard touchdown pass from Ryan Brand to Tavion Jacobs for Maryland, and a 17-yard touchdown run from Evans for Michigan.

With Chris Evans surpassing the 500-yard rushing mark for the season, he joined Ty Isaac and Karan Higdon to give Michigan three running backs with at least 500 rushing yards on the season for the first time since 1991.

at Wisconsin 

 Sources:

    
    
    
    
    

Following its game against Maryland, Michigan played its final road game against the Wisconsin Badgers. Michigan defeated the Badgers in a top 10 showdown during the prior meeting, winning 14–7.

Michigan lost to Wisconsin 24–10. Wisconsin opened the scoring in the first quarter via a 50-yard punt return from Nick Nelson. Michigan responded with a one-yard touchdown run from Ben Mason in the second quarter to tie the game at half-time. Michigan opened the scoring in the second half via a 39-yard field goal from Quinn Nordin, to take its first lead of the game. Wisconsin responded with 14 points in the third quarter via a 24-yard touchdown pass from Alex Hornibrook to A. J. Taylor, and a 32-yard touchdown run from Kendric Pryor. Wisconsin extended its lead in the fourth quarter via a 30-yard field goal from Rafael Gaglianone.

Michigan's defense held Wisconsin to just 5-of-15 on third down conversions. Michigan's offense averaged 207.8 rushing yards per game coming into the game.

vs. Ohio State 

 Sources:

    
    
    
    
    
    
    

Following its road finale against Wisconsin, Michigan hosted its arch-rivals, the Ohio State Buckeyes, in the 114th meeting of "The Game".

Michigan lost to Ohio State 31–20. Michigan opened the scoring in the first quarter via a two-yard touchdown run from Khalid Hill. Michigan extended its lead in the second quarter via a three-yard touchdown pass from John O'Korn to Sean McKeon. Ohio State responded with 14 points in the second quarter via a 21-yard touchdown run from J. T. Barrett, and a 25-yard touchdown pass from Barrett to Marcus Baugh to tie the game at half-time. Michigan regained the lead in the third quarter via a two-yard touchdown run from Karan Higdon. Ohio State responded with a one-yard touchdown run from J. K. Dobbins, giving Ohio State its first lead of the game. Ohio State scored 10 points in the fourth quarter via a 44-yard field goal from Sean Nuernberger, and a 25-yard touchdown run from Mike Weber.

Michigan's honorary captains for the game was former Wolverine and 1997 Heisman winner Charles Woodson, and alumnus Dao-Yi Chao, creative director and co-founder of Public School New York (PSNY). Senior left tackle and offensive captain Mason Cole made his 50th consecutive start on the offensive line for the Wolverines, tying him with Jon Jansen (1995–98) for most in program history among offensive linemen. Michigan's defense held Ohio State to minus-six yards of offense in the first quarter, marking the first full quarter in negative yardage for the Buckeyes since 2010. The first play during each of Ohio State's first three possessions resulted in a Michigan tackle for loss.

vs. South Carolina 

 Sources:

    
    
    
    
    
    
    
    
    

On December 3, Michigan was selected to play in the Outback Bowl against the South Carolina Gamecocks. Michigan lost the previous meeting in the 2013 Outback Bowl, by a score of 33–28. This was Michigan's 46th bowl game appearance, and sixth appearance in the Outback Bowl.

Michigan lost to South Carolina 26–19, becoming the only team in the Big Ten Conference to lose its bowl game in the 2017–2018 bowl season. Michigan scored six points in the first quarter via two field goals from Quinn Nordin, from 35-yards, and 26-yards, respectively. The teams exchanged field goals in the second quarter, one from Parker White from 44-yards for South Carolina, and one from Nordin from 45-yards for Michigan, which made the score 9–3 in favor of Michigan at half-time. Michigan scored 10 points in the third quarter via a one-yard touchdown run from Ben Mason, and a 48-yard field goal from Nordin. South Carolina responded with 23 straight points in the second half via a 17-yard touchdown run from Rico Dowdle and a 21-yard touchdown pass from Jake Bentley to Bryan Edwards in the third quarter. South Carolina took its first lead of the game in the fourth quarter via a 53-yard touchdown pass from Bentley to Shi Smith, and extended its lead via a 22-yard field goal from White.

Michigan's defense held South Carolina to 2-of-14 on third-down conversions, as the Gamecocks did not convert their first third-down opportunity until fewer than five minutes remained in the third quarter.

2018 NFL Draft

Roster

Awards and honors

References

External links

Michigan
Michigan Wolverines football seasons
Michigan Wolverines football